Gillotia  may refer to:
 Gillotia (fly), a genus of European non-biting midges in the subfamily Chironominae
 Gillotia (fungus),  a genus of fungi in the family Mycosphaerellaceae